Sanford Ballard Dole (April 23, 1844 – June 9, 1926) was an American-Hawaiian lawyer and jurist. He lived through the periods when Hawaii was a kingdom, protectorate, republic, and territory.  A Hawaiian-born descendant of the American missionary community in Hawaii, Dole advocated the westernization of Hawaiian government and culture. After the overthrow of the monarchy, he served as the President of the Republic of Hawaii until his government secured Hawaii's annexation by the United States.

Early years
Dole was born April 23, 1844, in Honolulu to Protestant Christian missionaries from Maine in the United States. His father was Daniel Dole (1808–1878), principal at Oahu College (known as Punahou School after 1934), and his mother was Emily Hoyt Ballard (1808–1844).  His mother died from complications within a few days of his birth. Dole was named after his maternal uncle, Sanford K. Ballard, a classmate of his father's at Bowdoin College who died in 1841. He was nursed by a native Hawaiian, and his father married Charlotte Close Knapp in 1846. In 1855 the family moved to Kōloa on the island of Kauai, where they operated another school, which Sanford attended.

Dole attended Oahu College for one year and then Williams College in 1866–1867. He worked in a law office in Boston for another year, at this time in the United States admission to the bar was by reading the law in an
apprenticeship under a lawyer and may have not required an examination, and thirty years later he would receive an honorary LL.D. degree from Williams, in 1897, in recognition of his service as the first and only elected president of Hawaii. 

In 1873 he married Anna Prentice Cate. In December 1880 he was commissioned as a Notary Public in Honolulu. Dole won the 1884 and 1886 elections to the legislature of the Hawaiian Kingdom as a representative from Kauai, serving from 1884–1887, during which time he was active in securing the constitution of 1887.

Bayonet Constitution
In June 1887 local businessmen, sugar planters, and politicians backed by the Honolulu Rifles forced the dismissal of the cabinet of controversial Walter M. Gibson and forced the adoption of the 1887 Constitution of the Kingdom of Hawaii. The new documents limited voting rights to the literate males of Hawaiian, European, and American descent, while imposing income and wealth requirements to be eligible to vote for the House of Nobles. This effectively consolidated power among the elite residents of the island. In addition, the new Constitution minimized the power of the Monarch in favor of more influential governance by the cabinet. Dole and other lawyers of American descent drafted this document, which became known as the "Bayonet Constitution".

King Kalākaua appointed Dole a justice of the Supreme Court of the Kingdom of Hawaii on December 28, 1887, and to a commission to revise judiciary laws on January 24, 1888. After Kalākaua's death, his sister Queen Liliuokalani appointed him to her Privy Council on August 31, 1891.

End of the monarchy

The monarchy ended on January 17, 1893, after the overthrow of the Kingdom of Hawaii organized by many of the same actors involved in the 1887 revolt. Although Dole declined to officially be part of the Committee of Safety, he helped draft their declaration.

Dole was named president of the Provisional Government of Hawaii that was formed after the coup and was recognized within 48 hours by all nations with diplomatic ties to the Kingdom of Hawaii, including the United Kingdom.
His cabinet (called the "executive council") included  James A. King as minister of the interior, William Owen Smith as attorney general, and banker Peter Cushman Jones as minister of finance. Dole acted as Minister of Foreign Affairs himself until February 15, 1894.
Later Samuel Mills Damon would serve as Minister of Finance.

With Grover Cleveland's election as President of the United States, the Provisional Government's hopes of annexation were derailed for a time. Indeed, Cleveland tried to directly help reinstate the monarchy, after an investigation led by James Henderson Blount. The Blount Report of July 17, 1893, commissioned by President Cleveland, concluded that the Committee of Safety conspired with U.S. ambassador John L. Stevens to land the United States Marine Corps, to forcibly remove Queen Liliuokalani from power, and declare a Provisional Government of Hawaii consisting of members from the Committee of Safety.

On November 16, 1893, Albert Willis presented the Queen with Cleveland's request that she grant amnesty to the revolutionists in return for being restored to the throne. This request she flatly refused, stating that the revolutionists should be punished and should have their lands confiscated. According to Willis, she recommended that they be put to death. Though she later denied ever having recommended any such thing, her alleged attitude lost her the goodwill of the Cleveland administration, which thereupon recognized the Republic of Hawaii on July 4, 1894. 

The Morgan Report of February 26, 1894, concluded that the overthrow was locally based, that it had its origins in monarchical corruption, and that American troops had not tried to bring about the monarchy's collapse: rather, that the troops had acted merely to protect American property and citizens. Not long afterward, the Provisional Government held a constitutional convention. On July 4, 1894, this convention proclaimed the formal establishment of the Republic of Hawaii.

President of the Republic of Hawaii

Lorrin A. Thurston declined to run for the presidency of the Republic of Hawaii, and Dole ran instead, winning election in 1894. Dole would serve as the first and only elected president of the Republic of Hawaii from 1894 to 1898. Dole in turn appointed Thurston to lead the lobbying effort in Washington, D.C., to secure Hawaii's annexation by the United States.

Dole's government secured diplomatic recognition from every nation that had recognized the Kingdom of Hawaii, and weathered several attempts to restore the monarchy, including a January 1895 counter-rebellion led by Robert William Wilcox. After being defeated, Wilcox and the other conspirators were captured and sentenced to death, but had their sentences reduced or commuted by Dole. Queen Liliuokalani abdicated and, under duress, swore allegiance to the Republic of Hawaii, declaring, "I hereby do fully and unequivocally admit and declare that the Government of the Republic of Hawaii is the only lawful Government of the Hawaiian Islands, and that the late Hawaiian monarchy is finally and forever ended and no longer of any legal or actual validity, force or effect whatsoever." She later provided a more detailed accounting of the events from her perspective in her book, Hawaii's story by Hawaii's queen, Liliuokalani.

Governor and federal judge

As president of the republic, Dole traveled to Washington, D.C., in early 1898 to personally urge annexation of Hawaii by the United States. On July 4, 1898, the U.S. Congress passed a joint resolution to annex the Republic of Hawaii. Known as the Newlands Resolution after its sponsor, U.S. Representative Francis Newlands (D-Nevada), it came into effect on August 12, 1898. A formal ceremony marking the transfer of Hawaiian state sovereignty to the United States was held that day on the steps of ʻIolani Palace where the Hawaiian flag was lowered and the American flag raised in its place.

Under the terms of the Resolution, Dole retained the powers he previously exercised as President of Hawaii while Congress developed a new Hawaiian territorial frame of government. Later, when one was established through the Hawaiian Organic Act, President William McKinley appointed Dole as the first governor of the Territory of Hawaii. Dole assumed the office on June 14, 1900, but resigned November 23, 1903, to accept an appointment by President Theodore Roosevelt as judge for the U.S. District Court of Hawaii after the death of Morris M. Estee. He served in that post until his retirement on December 16, 1915 and was replaced by Horace Worth Vaughan.

Dole also served on commissions for Honolulu parks and the public archives. He died after a series of strokes on June 9, 1926. His ashes were interred in the cemetery of Kawaiahao Church.

Family and legacy

Dole's cousin, Edmund Pearson Dole, came to Hawaii to practice law in 1895, and became Attorney General of Hawaii from 1900 to 1903. Another cousin, James Dole, came to Hawaii in 1899 and founded the Hawaiian Pineapple Company on Oahu, which later became the Dole Food Company. James' father Charles Fletcher Dole also came to Hawaii in 1909.

Dole Middle School, located in Kalihi Valley on the island of Oahu, was named after him in April 1956, about a century after his father founded the school in Kōloa.
In the film Princess Kaiulani, his role was played by Will Patton.

In Hawaiian, the pale and hair-like Spanish moss is called ʻumiʻumi-o-Dole, meaning "Dole's beard". His wife Anna  had the bird species Ciridops anna named after her.

References

Further reading
 William Michael Morgan, Pacific Gibraltar: U.S.-Japanese Rivalry Over the Annexation of Hawaii, 1885-1898 (2011) pp 200-1; see online review.

External links

 The Morgan Report (full-text, scanned images and additional commentary); supports Dole
  attacks Dole
 

|-

Businesspeople from Hawaii
American company founders
Governors of the Territory of Hawaii
Hawaiian Kingdom people
Republic of Hawaii politicians
1844 births
1926 deaths
Dole family
People associated with the overthrow of the Hawaiian Kingdom
Republic of Hawaii Foreign Ministers
Justices of the Hawaii Supreme Court
Hawaiian Kingdom judges
Territory of Hawaii judges
Judges of the United States District Court for the Territory of Hawaii
United States district court judges appointed by Theodore Roosevelt
Members of the Hawaiian Kingdom House of Representatives
Members of the Hawaiian Kingdom Privy Council
People of the Territory of Hawaii
Punahou School alumni
Williams College alumni
Heads of state in Oceania
Hawaii Republicans
Independent (Kuokoa) Party politicians
Heads of state of former countries
American expatriates in the Hawaiian Kingdom
Burials at Kawaiahaʻo Church
Politicians from Honolulu
People from Oahu
19th-century national presidents
19th-century American businesspeople
20th-century American businesspeople